Anadendrum is a genus of flowering plants in the family Araceae. It is native to China and Southeast Asia.

Species
Anadendrum affine Schott - Borneo, Sumatra
Anadendrum angustifolium Engl. - Thailand, Peninsular Malaysia
Anadendrum badium P.C.Boyce - Thailand
Anadendrum cordatum Schott - Sumatra
Anadendrum ellipticum Widyartini & Widjaja - Borneo, Sumatra, Java, Peninsular Malaysia
Anadendrum griseum P.C.Boyce - Thailand
Anadendrum latifolium Hook.f - Yunnan, Laos, Vietnam, Cambodia, Peninsular Malaysia, Borneo, Java, Sumatra, Sulawesi, Philippines 
Anadendrum marcesovaginatum P.C.Boyce - Thailand
Anadendrum marginatum Schott - Sumatra, Peninsular Malaysia, Sarawak
Anadendrum microstachyum (de Vriese & Miq.) Backer & Alderw. - Peninsular Malaysia, Borneo, Java, Sumatra, Sulawesi, Philippines, Thailand, southern China
Anadendrum montanum Schott - Yunnan, Indochina, Java, Sulawesi, Philippines 
Anadendrum superans Alderw. - Sumatra
Anadendrum Calcicola  Borneo. -

References

Monsteroideae
Araceae genera